Joseph Ronald "J. R." Quiñahan (born May 8, 1984) is a Filipino professional basketball player for the NLEX Road Warriors of the Philippine Basketball Association (PBA).

Professional career

Alaska Aces
Quiñahan was drafted by the Alaska Aces seventh overall in the 2007 PBA draft. In his rookie year in the PBA with Alaska, Quiñahan averaged 2.9 points, 2.7 rebounds, and 9.7 minutes in 39 games.

Burger King Whoppers / Air21 Express
On September 22, 2008, Quiñahan was traded by the Aces to the Burger King Whoppers for Mark Borboran.

Talk 'N Text Tropang Texters
In March 2010, him, Mark Yee, and Aaron Aban was traded by Air21 (formerly Burger King) to the Talk 'N Text Tropang Texters for Yancy de Ocampo and Ren-Ren Ritualo.

Return to Air21
In August 2010, Quiñahan was traded back to Air21 in a three-team trade that sent Ali Peek to Talk 'N Text and future Rain or Shine teammate and the other half of Extra Rice, Inc., Beau Belga.

Powerade Tigers
Quiñahan was again traded by Air21, this time to Powerade Tigers for 2 future draft picks.

Rain or Shine Elasto Painters
On August 26, 2011, him and Norman Gonzales were traded to Rain or Shine Elasto Painters for Doug Kramer and Josh Vanlandingham. With Rain or Shine, he has found his niche in the league and has had his longest tenure with a team and the best seasons of his career. He also was paired with another beefy center Beau Belga, forming the Extra Rice, Inc.. On March 21, 2016, Quiñahan scored his new career-high 25 points in a 101–114 loss to Tropang TNT. He credits his weight-shedding as one of the top reasons for his career season in the 2015–16 PBA season, weighing from a high of 295 pounds down to 260 pounds and until reaching 235 pounds.

GlobalPort Batang Pier
On October 13, 2016, Quiñahan was traded by the Rain or Shine Elasto Painters to the GlobalPort Batang Pier in exchange for Jay Washington.

NLEX Road Warriors and reunion with Yeng Guiao
On May 6, 2017, Quiñahan was traded again, this time to the NLEX Road Warriors along with Larry Fonacier as part of a four-team trade between the Road Warriors, GlobalPort, Meralco and TNT that also involved Garvo Lanete sent to the Bolts, Anthony Semerad to the KaTropa and Bradwyn Guinto, Sean Anthony and Jonathan Grey all to the Batang Pier.

PBA career statistics

As of the end of 2022–23 season Real GM

Season-by-season averages

|-
| align=left | 
| align=left | Alaska
| 37 || 9.7 || .464 || .333 || .593 || 2.6 || .6 || .1 || .4 || 2.9
|-
| align=left | 
| align=left | Air21 / Burger King
| 42 || 22.7 || .441 || .222 || .575 || 5.7 || 1.6 || .6 || 1.5 || 7.2
|-
| align=left rowspan=2| 
| align=left | Burger King
| rowspan=2|36 || rowspan=2|15.7 || rowspan=2|.459 || rowspan=2|.308 || rowspan=2|.429 || rowspan=2|4.7 || rowspan=2|1.2 || rowspan=2|.3 || rowspan=2|.8 || rowspan=2|4.9
|-
| align=left | Talk 'N Text
|-
| align=left rowspan=2| 
| align=left | Air21
| rowspan=2|25 || rowspan=2|18.6 || rowspan=2|.475 || rowspan=2|.214 || rowspan=2|.639 || rowspan=2|5.0 || rowspan=2|.9 || rowspan=2|.3 || rowspan=2|.9 || rowspan=2|7.0
|-
| align=left | Powerade
|-
| align=left | 
| align=left | Rain or Shine
| 52 || 20.4 || .434 || .237 || .667 || 5.6 || 1.4 || .4 || 1.0 || 7.2
|-
| align=left | 
| align=left | Rain or Shine
| 56 || 20.1 || .398 || .285 || .682 || 4.5 || 1.2 || .3 || .6 || 6.7
|-
| align=left | 
| align=left | Rain or Shine
| 24 || 21.9 || .360 || .319 || .610 || 5.0 || 1.5 || .4 || .7 || 6.9
|-
| align=left | 
| align=left | Rain or Shine
| 53 || 16.0 || .397 || .294 || .781 || 3.3 || 1.4 || .4 || .5 || 5.5
|-
| align=left | 
| align=left | Rain or Shine
| 54 || 22.3 || .470 || .289 || .729 || 4.9 || 1.9 || .5 || .6 || 11.7
|-
| align=left rowspan=2| 
| align=left | GlobalPort
| rowspan=2|36 || rowspan=2|26.1 || rowspan=2|.435 || rowspan=2|.284 || rowspan=2|.753 || rowspan=2|5.8 || rowspan=2|1.9 || rowspan=2|.6 || rowspan=2|.8 || rowspan=2|11.1
|-
| align=left | NLEX
|-
| align=left | 
| align=left | NLEX
| 42 || 26.2 || .405 || .273 || .718 || 5.0 || 2.5 || .5 || .8 || 11.4
|-
| align=left | 
| align=left | NLEX
| 31 || 28.0 || .438 || .378 || .833 || 4.7 || 2.5 || 1.1 || .5 || 11.8
|-
| align=left | 
| align=left | NLEX
| 11 || 30.8 || .420 || .362 || .833 || 6.5 || 3.0 || .2 || .5 || 13.8'
|-
| align=left | 
| align=left | NLEX
| 28 || 23.9 || .361 || .189 || .822 || 3.8 || 2.0 || .4 || 1.0 || 9.4
|-
| align=left | 
| align=left | NLEX
| 13 || 26.4 || .395 || .271 || .552 || 4.5 || 2.5 || .3 || .9 || 11.8
|-class=sortbottom
| align=center colspan=2 | Career
| 540 || 21.0 || .424 || .288 || .699 || 4.7 || 1.6 || .4 || .8 || 8.2

National team

3x3 Tournaments 
Quiñahan represented the Philippines in the 2017 FIBA 3x3 World Cup on June 17 to 21, 2017 in Nantes, France. They finished the tournament at 11th place.

Player profile
A  slotman who loves to use his heft to be effective inside the paint, Quiñahan also has a decent stroke from the outside and can consistently hit the open jumper from any distance.

Dubbed "Baby Shaq" in the Philippine Basketball League where he played for the Granny Goose team because of his physical resemblance to the former Los Angeles Lakers center Shaquille O'Neal. He was drafted in the first round of the 2007 PBA Draft by the Alaska Aces. He was then traded to the Air21 Express before the 2008–2009 season started. He had a short stint with the Talk 'N Text Tropang Texters before finding his way back again to Air21. He played college basketball for the University of the Visayas (UV) Green Lancers, winning the Cebu Schools Athletic Foundation, Inc. (CESAFI) men's basketball title in each of his 5 years with UV, as well as winning two MVP awards in 2003 and 2004.

References

External links
PBA.ph profile

1984 births
Living people
Alaska Aces (PBA) players
Barako Bull Energy players
Basketball players from Cebu
Cebuano people
Centers (basketball)
NorthPort Batang Pier players
NLEX Road Warriors players
Philippine Basketball Association All-Stars
Philippines national 3x3 basketball team players
Filipino men's 3x3 basketball players
Filipino men's basketball players
Power forwards (basketball)
Powerade Tigers players
Rain or Shine Elasto Painters players
TNT Tropang Giga players
UV Green Lancers basketball players
Alaska Aces (PBA) draft picks